Jerry Gelb is an American actor and voice actor.

Gelb moved to Los Angeles in late 1979.  He is a graduate of the Florida State University School of Theatre ('76). His work has ranged from improvisation at the Comedy Store to L.A. Theater, TV and film to directing modern theater through Shakespeare. Owner and director of Ear Whacks!, a voice services and ADR company, he has voice cast approximately 40 feature films, including Dark City and Lost in Space, and voiced over 60 feature films.  Jerry has also voiced a variety of anime series, such as Witch Hunter Robin and Magic Knight Rayearth. He has served on the National Board of the Screen Actors Guild and committees.

Filmography

Anime roles
 .hack//Legend of the Twilight as Katsuyuki
 Digimon Frontier as Toucanmon
 Magic Knight Rayearth as Eagle Vision
 Witch Hunter Robin as Master Yuji Kobari
 Gestalt as Soushi
 Fist of the North Star as Junk (credited as Donovan Ross)
 Vampire Princess Miyu as Bird, Unnamed Shinma
 Mobile Suit Gundam: The 08th MS Team as Masado (credited as Donovan Ross)
 The Wanderers as Guest Voice
 Bit the Cupid as Various Voices

Movies
 Cowboy Bebop: The Movie as Shadkins
 Jataka tales as Various Voices
 Bottoms Up as Premiere Paparazzi
 Chasing Ghosts as Jerry
 Latin Dragon as Earl Billings
 Wild Things 2 as Morgue Attendant
 A Night at Sophie's as Al 'Fat Al'
 Winning London as Bell Captain
 All You Need as Nelson
 The Granstream Saga as Additional Voice
 The Stranger as Additional Voice

Television
 Entourage as Additional Voices
 Book of Days as Priest
 Strong Medicine -  "Black N' Flu" as Ken King
 Strong Medicine - "Complications" as Ken King
 The Huntress -  "Showdown" as Nick Babbo
 Roswell  - "Max In The City" as The Emissary
 Unhappily Ever After as The Principal
 Max Monroe: Loose Cannon  - "Legacy" as Petrell Brother
 Paradise  - "Boomtown" as Henchman #1

ADR voice casting
 The Muppets' Wizard of Oz
 It's a Very Merry Muppet Christmas Movie
 All You Need
 Termination Man
 The Last Siege
 Devil's Arithmetic
 Lured Innocence
 Southern Cross
 Black Thunder
 Six String Samurai - ADR Supervisor
 Clockmaker
 Freedom Strike
 The Shrunken City
 Possums
 Lost in Space
 Dark City
 The Secret Kingdom
 Left Luggage
 Memorial Day
 The White Raven
 Spacejacked
 The Shooter
 Don't Sleep Alone
 Do You Wanna Dance?
 Scorpio One
 Shadow Dancer
 Surface to Air

External links
 
 Ear Whacks Voice Casting
 

Living people
Year of birth missing (living people)
Place of birth missing (living people)
American male voice actors
Florida State University alumni